Sara Luther Neumaier (née Fletcher; December 6, 1918 – February 3, 2015), known as Sally Luther, was an American politician.

She was born in Minneapolis, Minnesota. A newspaper reporter, she attended Vassar College. She served in the Minnesota House of Representatives for the 51st District from 1951 to 1962. After leaving office, she earned a M.A. degree from the State University of New York at New Paltz and her doctorate from City University of New York. She also wrote a book about international broadcasting in space: The United States and the Direct Broadcast Satellite: The Politics of International Broadcasting in Space, wrote articles, and gave lectures. Sally Luther died of leukemia at her home in Mount Dora, Florida on February 3, 2015, aged 96.

References

1918 births
2015 deaths
Democratic Party members of the Minnesota House of Representatives
Women state legislators in Minnesota
Journalists from Minnesota
State University of New York at New Paltz alumni
City University of New York alumni
Vassar College alumni
Politicians from Minneapolis
Writers from Minneapolis
Deaths from cancer in Florida
Deaths from leukemia
People from Mount Dora, Florida
21st-century American women